Bowes Park railway station is in the London Borough of Haringey in north London, and is on the boundary of Travelcard Zone 3 and Travelcard Zone 4. The station and all trains serving it are operated by Great Northern, on the Hertford Loop Line. It was first opened by the GNR in 1880, some nine years after the Loop Line itself was completed.

The station is a short walk from Bounds Green Underground station on the Piccadilly line, with which it is a valid out-of-station interchange. It has an unusual location in that it is situated between two quiet residential cul-de-sacs and is accessed from a footbridge over the railway line which divides those streets.

Bowes Park is the only station on the entire Hertford Loop with an island platform.

In autumn 2008, a new Shere FASTticket self-service ticket machine, accepting both cash and credit cards, was installed here (and similarly at other local Govia Thameslink Railway stations).

To the north of the station is a single siding in between the two running tracks which is occasionally used to turn around East Coast InterCity 225 and 125 trains heading for Bounds Green Depot just north of Alexandra Palace. A connection to the now disused GER Palace Gates Line whose terminus, Palace Gates (Wood Green), lay just to the south, was made in 1929.

Services
All services at Bowes Park are operated by Great Northern using  EMUs.

The typical off-peak service in trains per hour is:
 2 tph to 
 2 tph to  via 

Ticketing

 Oyster pay and go has been accepted at the station since 2 January 2010.

References

External links

 The History of Bowes Park Railway station on local Community Website Bowes and Bounds Connected

Railway stations in the London Borough of Haringey
Former Great Northern Railway stations
Railway stations in Great Britain opened in 1880
Railway stations served by Govia Thameslink Railway